The Mayi-Kutuna, also spelt Mayaguduna and Maikudunu, are an Aboriginal Australian people of the Cape York Peninsula in the state of Queensland, whose language has become extinct.

Country
Their southern extension lay around Mount Cuthbert. Their western limits ran to the eastern margin of the inland plateau.

Alternative names
 Maikudun, Maikudung.
 Maigudung.
 Mikoodoono.
 Maigudina.
 Mygoodan, Mygoodano, Mayagoondoon.
 Mikadoon.
 Mikoolun.

Notes

Citations

Sources

Aboriginal peoples of Queensland